Enzo Scionti (born 22 April 2005) is an American racing driver who last competed in the 2021 Euroformula Open Championship with Drivex School.

Racing record

Racing career summary 

* Season still in progress.

Complete F4 UAE Championship results 
(key) (Races in bold indicate pole position) (Races in italics indicate fastest lap)

Complete Euroformula Open Championship results 
(key) (Races in bold indicate pole position; races in italics indicate points for the fastest lap of top ten finishers)

References

External links 
 

Living people
2005 births
American racing drivers
Euroformula Open Championship drivers
Drivex drivers
Cram Competition drivers
Karting World Championship drivers
FA Racing drivers
UAE F4 Championship drivers
Racing drivers from Houston
Racing drivers from Texas
Sportspeople from Houston
Formula Regional European Championship drivers
Monolite Racing drivers